Concert at the Crescendo Vol. 1 is a 1955 jazz album by jazz trumpeter Louis Armstrong.

Personnel
Louis Armstrong – Trumpet, vocals
Barney Bigard – Clarinet
Trummy Young – Trombone
Billy Kyle – Piano
Barrett Deems – drums
Arvell Shaw – Double Bass
Velma Middleton – vocals

Louis Armstrong albums
1955 live albums
Decca Records live albums